The city of San Jose, California, known for its height-limited downtown skyline due to its proximity to San Jose International Airport, has over 46 high-rises, mostly in downtown. The next most populous city in the U.S. with no buildings of 300 feet is Fresno, California.

Tallest buildings

This lists ranks San Jose buildings that meet the common definition of skyscraper, those having a height exceeding  including spires and architectural details, but not antenna masts.

Tallest under construction, approved and proposed

Under construction

This lists buildings that are under construction in San Jose and are planned to rise at least . Under construction buildings that have already been topped out are also included.

Approved
This lists buildings that are approved for construction in San Jose and are planned to rise at least .

Proposed
This lists buildings that are proposed in San Jose and are planned to rise at least .

* Table entries with dashes (—) indicate that information regarding building floor counts or dates of completion has not yet been released.

References
General

Specific

External links

Diagram of San Jose skyscrapers on SkyscraperPage

San Jose
San Jose
Tallest buildings